James Heller may refer to:

 James G. Heller (1892–1971), American composer and rabbi
 James Heller (24 character), fictional president in the TV series 24
 The protagonist in the video game Prototype 2